Jean-Luc Martinez (born 22 March 1964) is the former president of the Louvre. In May 2022 French police charged him with crimes including fraud and money laundering related to antiquities trafficking.

Martinez began working at the Louvre in 1997 as a curator. He was the president of the Louvre from 2013 to 2022, and before that, the director of the museum’s Greek, Etruscan, and Roman art departments.

Decorations 
 Chevalier of the Legion of Honour (2015)

References

External links 
 Jean-Luc Martinez on data.bnf.fr

Living people
French curators
1964 births
Chevaliers of the Légion d'honneur
Members of the French School at Athens
Directors of the Louvre
French art historians